The Onion Lake Border Chiefs are a Canadian junior B ice hockey team located in Onion Lake, Saskatchewan. They joined the North Eastern Alberta Junior B Hockey League in 2014 and play out of the Onion Lake Memorial Communiplex. Their head coach is Mike Clague.

History

The Border Chiefs were founded in 2014 along with the Frog Lake T-Birds. They became the second team in the NEAJBHL to play out of a First Nations reserve (the other being the T-Birds). In their first season, they finished eighth out of ten teams in the NEAJBHL, with a record of 13–20–3, and were swept in the first round of the NEAJBHL playoffs by the Wainwright Bisons.

Season-by-season record
Record as of 2017–18 season.

See also
List of ice hockey teams in Saskatchewan

References

External links
Onion Lake Border Chiefs at EliteProspects.com

Ice hockey teams in Saskatchewan
2014 establishments in Saskatchewan